The Vasylivka Historical and Architectural Museum-Reserve "Popov Manor House" (also known as Vasylivka Castle) is an established museum complex at a partly preserved manor house built between 1864 and 1884 near the town of Vasylivka, Ukraine by Vasili Popov Jr. (a grandson of General Vasili Stepanovich Popov). 

The Historic and Cultural Reserve was created on 29 January 1993 in place of the existing Vasylivka museum of local history.

Manor House
Its Gothic Revival design is attributed to Nicholas Benois. The main house had a telescope, a picture gallery, and an ethnographic museum. The castle was looted by the Bolsheviks and ruined by the Germans in the Second World War. Restoration works did not start until the 1990s.

Shelling and robbery of the estate 
On March 7, 2022, during the military invasion of Ukraine, the Popov Manor was fired upon by Russian troops. The arena-stable building of the Popov manor was damaged.

On March 13, 2022, the museum was looted by the Russian military. In addition to the robbery, they damaged the premises, broke the windows and broke all the doors.

Gallery

See also
 List of historic reserves in Ukraine

References

External links 

 Official website

Manor houses in Ukraine
Museums in Zaporizhzhia Oblast
Landmarks in Zaporizhzhia Oblast
Buildings and structures in Zaporizhzhia Oblast
Historic sites in Ukraine
Gothic Revival architecture in Ukraine
Buildings and structures destroyed during the 2022 Russian invasion of Ukraine